Florence Giorgetti (15 February 1944 – 31 October 2019) was a French stage and film actress. She was nominated for the César Award for Best Supporting Actress for her role in The Lacemaker.

She died in October 2019, in her native Paris, aged 75.

On stage

Filmography

References

External links
 

1944 births
2019 deaths
20th-century French actresses
21st-century French actresses
Actresses from Paris
French film actresses
French stage actresses